Bands Reunited is a television program produced by VH1 in 2004. Hosted by Aamer Haleem, the show documents attempted reunions of formerly popular musical groups for special concerts in either London or Los Angeles.

A show normally consists of the crew first hunting down the ex-members of the band (often first in a ruse) one-by-one, and convincing them to agree for the one-time concert. The members are "contracted" by signing a record album by their former band. The band members are interviewed, usually focusing on the reasons of their disbandment. The final segment is the formal reunion of the band in the rehearsing studio, and a joint interview about having disbanded. If the reunion was successful, the episode ends with the final performance.

In 2005, VH1 attempted to reunite the British band the Smiths, but the show abandoned its attempt after Aamer Haleem unsuccessfully apprehended lead singer Morrissey before a show.

Criticism
The artificial and invasive nature of the reality show, and the contractual arrangements behind it, have been criticized. Kurt Harland of Information Society detailed his own negative experiences with the program, and how his experiences differed from the portrayal of events as broadcast, on his website; citing examples of misinformation, poor background research and manipulation from the show's production crew, regarding the show to have been more interested in sensationalising his band's breakup than a genuine reunion.

Bands

References

External links
Bands Reunited Homepage
 

American non-fiction television series
2000s American reality television series
VH1 original programming
Pop music television series
Rock music television series
VH1 music shows
English-language television shows
2000s American music television series
2004 American television series debuts
2006 American television series endings
Television series by Evolution Film & Tape